Luffness Friary, was a friary of the Carmelites, commonly known as the white friars, established in Luffness, Scotland.

References

Carmelite monasteries in Scotland
1560 disestablishments in Scotland
Former Christian monasteries in Scotland